Yang Hong-seok (Korean: 양홍석; born April 17, 1994), better known by the mononym Hongseok, is a South Korean singer and actor. He debuted as a vocalist of the group boy group Pentagon in October 2016. Aside from group activities as singer, he has debuted as an actor in the Korean movie, The Love That's Left.

Early life and education
Hongseok was born on April 17, 1994 in Seoul, South Korea. He has an older brother named Jun-seok. He studied abroad in the United States, China, and Singapore and has lived outside of South Korea for a total of 11 years. From 2007 to 2010, he was a student at Hwa Chong International School in Singapore, where he was the school's top swimmer.

Career

Pre-debut 
In 2014, Hongseok joined YG Entertainment and participated in the reality survival program Mix & Match as a member of TEAM B. He was eliminated in final episode alongside Jung Jin-hyeong, failing to debut as a member of iKON. In March 2015, it was revealed that he left YG Entertainment.

In July 2015, he joined Cube Entertainment. In February 2016, he modeled alongside Hyuna for the fashion brand Clride.n.

2016–present: Debut with Pentagon and solo activities 

In late 2016, he participated in the Mnet reality survival show Pentagon Maker, ultimately making it to the final lineup of Pentagon. He officially debuted with Pentagon on October 10, 2016 with the song "Gorilla" from their self-titled EP.

In November 2017, Hongseok made his acting debut in the movie .

In July 2018, Hongseok joined the cast of Visiting Tutor, a variety program where celebrities seek out a student and become their tutor. He held Chinese lessons for his student. The show ran from August to October. In September, he was cast in the variety program Real Man 300, which featured celebrities experiencing life in the military. The show end in late January 2019.

In January 2019, he co-starred in the television drama Best Chicken as Bae Ki-Bum, a likeable troublemaker. In March, he starred in his first web drama On The Campus. In May, Hongseok starred in the Naver V web drama Anniversary Anyway. He was the cover model for the July 2019 issue of Men's Health's Korea. Later that month he was cast in the reality-documentary show Law of the Jungle in Myanmar. In August, he was a contestant on King of Mask Singer, where he performed a cover of Huh Gak's "Hello".

In October 2020, he and bandmate Kino made a cameo in the web drama Twenty-Twenty. He made his second appearance on the cover of Men's Health Korea for the December 2020 issue.

From January to March 2021, Hongseok starred as the supporting character Shin A-jun in the SBS drama Phoenix 2020. He portrayed a police officer in the Netflix series Move to Heaven, released on May 14th. Hongseok played the lead in the web series Blue Birthday, which was released in the summer of 2021.

Personal life 
Hongseok can speak three languages: Korean, Chinese, and English.

Hongseok is an avid fan of fitness. He regularly posts videos online detailing his workouts and diets in a series called Hongseok is Working Out Hong Hong Hong.

Military service 
On April 1, 2022, the agency announced that Hongseok would be enlisting for his mandatory military service as an active duty soldier on May 3. On December 26, 2022, it was confirmed by the agency that Hongseok would be discharged from military service early due to depression and panic disorder with public phobia.

Philanthropy
Hongseok participated in the world's biggest Ice Bucket Challenge, 2019 Miracle365 x Ice Bucket Challenge Run on June 29, 2019 in Dongjak-gu, Seoul. The event was organized by Seungil Hope Foundation to raise awareness about ALS. The event raised 42 million won, and all proceeds went to build the first Lou Gehrig's Nursing Hospital in South Korea. The event started with a 3km, 5km, 7km and 8km group marathon with 1,130 participants who broke a total of 918 challenges the previous year.

Discography

Writing and production credits 
All credits are adapted from the Korea Music Copyright Association, unless stated otherwise.

Filmography

Film

Television series

Web series

Television shows

Hosting

Awards and nominations

References

External links
 

1994 births
21st-century South Korean  male singers
Cube Entertainment artists
Living people
Pentagon (South Korean band) members
South Korean pop singers
South Korean male idols
South Korean male film actors
South Korean male television actors
South Korean male web series actors
English-language singers from South Korea